Dieter Bender (born 20 May 1940) is a German rower. 

At the 1961 European Rowing Championships, he won a gold medal in the coxless pair partnered with Günther Zumkeller. For their 1961 European Championship title, Zumkeller and Bender received the Silbernes Lorbeerblatt (Silver Laurel Leaf), the highest sports award in Germany. The pair then won a gold medal at the 1962 World Rowing Championships in Lucerne in the same boat class.

References

1940 births
Living people
West German male rowers
World Rowing Championships medalists for Germany
Recipients of the Silver Laurel Leaf
European Rowing Championships medalists